Moon Lovers may refer to:

 Moon Lovers: Scarlet Heart Ryeo, a 2016 South Korean TV series that had the working title Moon Lovers
 Tsuki no Koibito (English: Moon Lovers), a 2010 Japanese TV series